Keith Barton is a former association football player who represented New Zealand at international level.

Barton made a solitary official international appearance for New Zealand in a 2–2 draw with China on 23 July 1975.

Barton holds the record for number of appearances for Stop Out. He also appeared in two Chatham Cup finals whilst with Western Suburbs FC. In 1970 and 1971.

References 

Living people
New Zealand association footballers
New Zealand international footballers
Stop Out players
1951 births
Association football defenders